Jozef Kapláň (born 2 April 1986) is a Slovak professional footballer who plays for OŠK Bešeňová. He is able to take up the role of both a striker and an attacking midfielder. He is also a UEFA B License holder.

Career

Earlier career
Kapláň began his professional club career at FK Železiarne Podbrezová in 2007 and played until 2008 before moving to Liptovský Mikuláš. With Liptovský Mikuláš, he appeared in 79 league matches and scored 26 goals between 2008 and 2012.

After being released by Liptovský Mikuláš in late 2011, Mike Wong signed him as a free agent. He ended his 2012 S.League season on high, scoring 17 goals in 34 games, becoming the club top scorer for that season. In 2013, the team management of Geylang International announced that Jozef Kapláň will be made as captain for the team.

He received the Singa-Goal.com player of the month "June 2013" award after scoring 3 out of 4 goals his team had scored in the month of June. During the 2012 and 2013 seasons, he scored a total of 32 goals for the side, appearing in 57 matches alongside captaining the Eagles.

In December 2013, he joined Malaysia Premier League side Negeri Sembilan, but in April 2014 he was back in Singapore, signing for Tampines Rovers. With Tampines, he lifted the Singapore Charity Shield in 2014.

Geylang International FC
Kaplan joined Geylang International FC for the 2015 S.League season. He is one of the leading top scorers in S.league. Kaplan is well known for his ability to peel off defenders due to his pace and dribbling skills, prominently in the opponent's half.

He is a player who is good putting balls behind the net which made him a prolific striker and his 7 goals make him the league's highest-scoring midfielder in that season.

Hougang United FC
Kaplan joined Hougang United FC from Geylang International FC for the 2016 S-league season, undisclosed fee and appeared in 24 league matches, scoring 3 goals.

Chennai CityFC
On 29 November 2018, he signed for I-League side Chennai City and appeared in 10 league matches for the club. He also clinched the 2018–19 I-League title with the club, managed by Akbar Nawas.

OŠK Bešeňová
On 23 August 2019, Kaplan returned to Slovakia and joined OŠK Bešeňová.

Career statistics

Club

Notes

Honours

Club
FK Železiarne Podbrezová
Slovak First League Runners-up (1): 2007–08
Tampines Rovers
 Singapore Charity Shield Winners (1): 2014
Singapore League Cup Winners (1): 2014
Chennai City FC
I-League Winners (1): 2018–19

See also
Slovak expatriate footballers

References

External links
 Jozef Kapláň statistics at m.live-result.com
 

1986 births
Living people
Slovak footballers
Slovak expatriate footballers
Association football defenders
FK Železiarne Podbrezová players
MFK Tatran Liptovský Mikuláš players
FK Poprad players
Geylang International FC players
Tampines Rovers FC players
Negeri Sembilan FA players
Chennai City FC players
Singapore Premier League players
2. Liga (Slovakia) players
I-League players
Slovak expatriate sportspeople in Singapore
Slovak expatriate sportspeople in Malaysia
Expatriate footballers in Singapore
Expatriate footballers in Malaysia
Expatriate footballers in India
Slovak expatriate sportspeople in India